

2000

Non-circulating coins

Circulating coins

2001

Non-circulating coins

Circulating coins

2002

Non-circulating coins

Circulating coins

2003

Non-circulating coins

Circulating coins

2004

Non-circulating coins

Circulating coins

2005

Non-circulating coins

Circulating coins

2006

Non-circulating coins

Circulating coins

2007

Non-circulating coins

Circulating coins

Medals

2008

Non-circulating coins

Circulating coins

Medals

2009

Non-circulating coins

Circulating coins

Medals

References 

Commemorative coins of the United States